The Social Democratic Party of Popular Accord is a political party in Belarus. It was created in 1997, and is led by Siarhiej Jermak. It supports the government of president Alexander Lukashenko.

The Social Democratic Party of Popular Accord considers itself the successor of the People's Accord Party (PAP).

The party has stated its commitment to a social market economy according to the formula: "the market - as far as possible, government regulation - as far as necessary." Such a model aims to cut off the most negative features of a market economy.

The party's only seat won in a Belorussian legislative election was in 2000.

In the 2018 elections to local councils of deputies, 11 representatives were elected from the party.

In the 2019 Belarusian parliamentary election, the party did not nominate candidates on party lists, and 1 representative of the party was nominated through the collection of signatures.

References

 

1997 establishments in Belarus
Political parties established in 1997
Political parties in Belarus
Social democratic parties in Belarus